Jeevan Ek Sanghursh is a  1990 Bollywood film directed by Rahul Rawail, produced by D. Rama Naidu. It stars Raakhee, Anil Kapoor and Madhuri Dixit in the leading roles. The film was successful and was the tenth highest grossing Bollywood film of 1990. Rawail's father H. S. Rawail was also a film director, best known for romantic films like Mere Mehboob (1963),  Mehboob Ki Mehndi (1971) and Laila Majnu (1976). By titling this film as Jeevan Ek Sanghursh, Rawail paid a tribute to one of his father's films; Sunghursh (1968), based on a novel written by the Bengali author Mahashweta Devi. The film was set in the 19th century and showcased the lives of bandits and stars actors like Dilip Kumar, Vyjayanthimala, Balraj Sahni, Sanjeev Kumar and Jayant.

Plot

Widowed Sulakshana Devi (Raakhee) has three children: two sons, Arjun (Kanwaljit Singh) and Karan, and a daughter, Suman (Shehnaz Kudia). They live in a rented house and the landlord behaves badly with Sulakshana Devi and robs all her money. Karan decides to rob the landlord, but gets caught and is sent to the children's remand home. Sulakshana Devi decides to visit Karan before they leave for Mumbai, but realises that he ran away from the remand home. Karan also makes his way to Mumbai, where he is picked up by a garage owner.

During a road-side fight, grown up Karan (Anil Kapoor) is caught by police and is offered to work for Devraj Kamat (Anupam Kher), a criminal mastermind. Karan refuses the offer, but Kamat informs his rival Rattan Dholakia (Paresh Rawal). Rattan frames Karan for a murder of a police officer, but is freed by Kamat when he agrees to work with him. Karan tries to meet his family through Arjun (Kanwaljit Singh) and Suman (Shehnaz Kudia), but Sulakshana Devi refuses to accept him. Various incidents lead Karan to meet and fall in love with Madhu (Madhuri Dixit) and he decides to leave the underworld. However, Kamat and Dholakia join hands to destroy Karan as he was a critical part of their underworld operations.

Cast

 Raakhee as Sulakshana Devi
 Anil Kapoor as Karan Kumar
 Madhuri Dixit as Madhu Sen
 Anupam Kher as Devraj Kamat
 Paresh Rawal as Rattan Dholakia
 Moon Moon Sen as Shivani
 Pankaj Dheer as Mahesh Dholakia
 Kanwaljit Singh as Arjun Kumar
 Shehnaz Kudia as Suman
 Abhinav Chaturvedi as Vinod
 Chandrashekhar Dubey as Roop Chand
 Mangal Dhillon as Police Inspector Gill

Soundtrack

References

External links

1990s Hindi-language films
1990 films
Films scored by Laxmikant–Pyarelal
Films directed by Rahul Rawail
Suresh Productions films